The Ozone Vulcan is a French single-place paraglider that was designed by hang gliding and paragliding world champion pilot Robbie Whittall and produced by Ozone Gliders of Le Bar-sur-Loup. It is no longer in production.

Design and development
The Vulcan was designed as an intermediate sports glider and replaced the Ozone Octane in the product line. The Vulcan models are each designated according to their relative size.

Operational history
Reviewer Noel Bertrand described the Ozone series of gliders in a 2003 review as, "wings that are both pleasant to fly and high performance in their respective categories".

Variants
Vulcan XS
Extra small-sized model for much lighter pilots. The glider model is certified to the German DHV 2 standard.
Vulcan S
Small-sized model for lighter pilots. The glider model is DHV 2 certified.
Vulcan M
Medium-small-sized model for medium-weight pilots. The glider model is DHV 2 certified.
Vulcan L
Large-sized model for heavier pilots. The glider model is DHV 2 certified.
Vulcan XL
Extra large-sized model for much heavier pilots. The glider model is DHV 2 certified.

Specifications (Vulcan L)

References

External links

Vulcan
Paragliders